is a Japanese actress, voice actress and singer affiliated with BLACK SHIP.

Biography
In 2000, Mika made her stage debut as Janet in the Japanese version of the musical Annie. She also had small roles in Suicide Circle and Battle Royale II: Requiem before landing the role of Koume "Umeko" Koudo/DekaPink in 2004's iteration of the Super Sentai franchise, Tokusou Sentai Dekaranger.

Mika then diversified into voice acting in 2005, voicing the character Mokona in the anime Tsubasa Chronicle and xxxHoLiC, based on Clamp's popular manga. She has also presented a children's variety show Nyanchuu World on the NHK channel, as well as net radio work for Tsubasa Chronicle (with fellow voice actress Yui Makino) and Mai Otome (with Ami Koshimizu), the popular anime in which she plays the lead character Arika Yumemiya. On December 16, 2009, her birthday, she married actor Yūji Kishi, who is 13 years her senior. They met during the 2007 Japanese stage tour of Les Misérables, and coincidentally both have had their acting debuts in a Super Sentai Series.  They filed for divorce on December 29, 2011. On August 31, 2018 it was announced on her Twitter account that she got married again, this time to her fellow Dekaranger cast member Tomokazu Yoshida (who played Tetsu/DekaBreak).

Filmography

Anime

TV
Tsubasa: Reservoir Chronicle (2005–06) – Mokona Modoki
Mai Otome (2005–06) – Arika Yumemiya
Pokémon: Battle Frontier (2005) – Shiromi
Capeta (2006) – Monami Suzuki (Middle School)
xxxHolic (2006–08) – Mokona Modoki
The Girl Who Leapt Through Space (2009) – Bougainvillea
Katekyo Hitman REBORN (2010) – Bluebell
Girls und Panzer (2012–13) – Noriko Isobe
Robot Girls Z (2014) – Minerva X
Last Period (2018) – Liza

Films
Tsubasa Reservoir Chronicle the Movie: The Princess in the Birdcage Kingdom (2005) – Mokona Modoki
XxxHolic: A Midsummer Night's Dream (2005) – Mokona Modoki
 Girls und Panzer der Film (2015) – Noriko Isobe
 Girls und Panzer das Finale: Part 1 (2017) – Noriko Isobe
 Girls und Panzer das Finale: Part 2 (2019) – Noriko Isobe
 Girls und Panzer das Finale: Part 3 (2021) – Noriko Isobe

Original video animation (OVA)
Tsubasa Tokyo Revelations (2007–08) – Mokona Modoki
Tsubasa Spring Thunder Chronicles (2009) – Mokona Modoki
xxxHolic Shunmuki (2009) – Mokona Modoki
xxxHolic Rō (2010–11) – Mokona Modoki
Yankee-kun na Yamada-kun to Megane-chan to Majo (2015) – Rinka Himeji

Live-action
Tokusou Sentai Dekaranger – Koume "Umeko" Kodou/Dekapink  (2004 -2005)
One Missed Call – Kanna
Kamen Rider Kabuto – Yuki Tamai (Guest in episode 3)
Nyanchuu World – Mika-Chan (Host; Children's Series)

Films
Suicide Circle (2001) – Sakura Kuroda
Φ, Phi (xxxx) – Ayaka
Battle Royale II: Requiem (2003) – Ayane Yagi
Tokusou Sentai Dekaranger The Movie: Full Blast Action (2004) – Koume "Umeko" Kodou/Dekapink
Tokusou Sentai Dekaranger vs. Abaranger (2005) – Koume "Umeko" Kodou/Dekapink
Mahou Sentai Magiranger vs. Dekaranger (2006) – Koume "Umeko" Kodou/Dekapink
Chō Ninja Tai Inazuma! (2006) – Jun Terada
Engine Sentai Go-onger: Boom Boom! Bang Bang! GekijōBang!! (2008) – Honoshu Warrior Tsukinowa
Gokaiger Goseiger Super Sentai 199 Hero Great Battle (2011) – Koume "Umeko" Kodou/Dekapink
Kamen Rider Heisei Generations: Dr. Pac-Man vs. Ex-Aid & Ghost with Legend Rider (2016) - News Reporter
Space Squad (2017) – Koume "Umeko" Kodou/Dekapink
Gozen (2019)

Stage
Annie – Janet
Morning Musume Musical:Love Century -Yume wa Minakerya Hajimaranai- – Chika
Ginga Tetsudou no Yoru – Kaoru
NOISE – Mami
My Life – Yumi
Les Misérables (2007-2009 Japanese Stage Tour) – Cosette
Hakuōki Musical: Hijikata Toshizo version – Yukimura Chizuru

Discography

Related CDs
My Star by Mika Kikuchi. This CD Single (AVCA-22878, released by avex mode) is her debut single; this from Mika's own venture into recording her own music.
Hanjuku Heroine (半熟ヒロイン☆) by Mika Kikuchi and Ami Koshimizu (Mai Otome net radio opening theme)
Otome wa DO MY BEST desho? (乙女はDO MY BESTでしょ？) by Mika Kikuchi and Ami Koshimizu (Mai Otome ending theme)
Tokusou Sentai Dekaranger OST (features several tracks with Mika's vocals)
Mahou Sentai Magiranger OST (Song: "Tenkuukai no Yasuragi ~ Peace in the Heavens")
Chou Ninja Tai Inazuma OST: Thank You ~2007 .Jun ver~

References

External links
 
 
Mika Kikuchi at GamePlaza-Haruka Voice Acting Database 

1983 births
Living people
Japanese musical theatre actresses
Japanese video game actresses
Japanese voice actresses
Voice actresses from Saitama Prefecture